Eye Level Learning, formerly known as E.nopi, offers supplementary educational programs from Daekyo. The name "Eye Level Learning" is used internationally whilst in South Korea, where Daekyo is headquartered, it is named "Noonnoppi" meaning "eye level".

Eye Level works through the No Child Left Behind Act. Eye Level offers tutoring known as Supplemental Education Services. Eye Level is an overseas education business which operates as learning centers. Eye Level has global networks of more than 20 countries, including the subsidiaries in the US (New York, New Jersey, LA, Chicago, Dallas, Washington, DC, Saint Louis, and Atlanta), China (Shanghai, Hong Kong), Malaysia, Indonesia, the Philippines, India, and Singapore.

Teaching Philosophy 
Eye Level's teaching philosophy started with understanding children’s point of view, as what they call children’s “eye level education” to let them learn at their own learning pace.

Traditional academics assume that all classroom teaching is based on mass education, using the same teaching materials for the same courses of studies. But Eye Level pursues children achieve a level of mastery to move on to the next stage of learning and let them learn at their own pace.

See also
Storefront school

References

External links

Daekyo website

Education companies of South Korea
Education companies established in 1976
1976 establishments in South Korea